South African-Ukrainian relations refers to the current and historical relations between South Africa and Ukraine.  South Africa established an embassy in Kyiv in October 1992 while Ukraine established an embassy in Pretoria in 1995.

2022 Russian invasion 
South Africa has avoided criticizing Russia's 2014 annexation of Crimea and instead argued for solidarity amongst BRICS nations.  

Although initially critical of Russia's 2022 invasion of Ukraine, South Africa sought to repair and maintain friendly relations with Russia. President Ramaphosa stated that South Africans "in the main" support the South African government's neutral position on the war.

South Africa was one of 35 countries that abstained from voting on a United Nations condemnation of Russia's invasion of the country, a stance that Ukrainian Ambassador to South Africa Liubov Abravitova described as "puzzling", "unacceptable" and "alarming." Said ambassador later stated that her country was finding it difficult to engage with the South African government on the issue due to a lingering goodwill towards Russia, citing the Soviet Union's assistance to the anti-apartheid struggle as the reason, something the ruling African National Congress (ANC) views as being provided by Russia.

On 20 April 2022, South African president Cyril Ramaphosa and Ukrainian President Volodymyr Zelensky discussed the war, seven weeks after Ramaphosa discussed the war with Russian President Vladimir Putin. The length of time between Ramaphosa's discussions with the two and the reported difficulty that the Ukrainians had in organising the meeting was cause for controversy. 

A March 2022 draft resolution presented by South Africa to the United Nations was criticized by Ukraine as favouring Russia without consulting Ukraine. This draft resolution omitted any mention of Russia's aggressive actions towards Ukraine. Instead, an alternative resolution proposed by France and Mexico that explicitly mentioned Russia as the aggressor was adopted.

Response in the Western Cape 

Domestically, the South African government's position was controversial among its citizens. The Western Cape Government (headed by the opposition party Democratic Alliance) lit up the provincial government buildings and the Cape Town City Hall in the blue and gold of the Ukrainian flag in support of the country. The mayor of Cape Town, Geordin Hill-Lewis, pledged support on 2 March for the city of Kyiv and all Ukraine during the war, and called on his nation's government as well as governments worldwide to "do more for peace to be restored and for the unprovoked and illegal aggression against the Ukrainian people to be halted." The ANC and Al Jamah-ah parties were reportedly opposed to the City Hall's lighting ceremony. 

The Western Cape provincial cabinet later passed a resolution supporting Ukraine and condemning the Russian invasion, as well as the clampdown on protest within Russia against the war. "While doing so is not common for a province", a provincial government newsletter stated, "it was viewed as essential to make clear to our own residents, to the people of Ukraine, and to the rest of the world that we cannot and will not remain 'neutral' in the face of such a cruel attack on the democratic values we all hold dear." The condemnation also included a boycott of the events or meetings hosted by the Russian Embassy and Consulates, as well as a refusal to invite them to the Western Cape Government's own events or meetings.

Economy 
In 2008, South Africa was ranked second (after Ghana) among all African countries in terms of products exported to Ukraine. In that year, trade between the two countries had grown 5.4 times to $375.1 million. By 2021, South Africa exported R434.83 million (US$ 28.98 million) and imported R730.10 million (US$ 48.67 million) worth of goods to and from Ukraine.

See also 
 Foreign relations of South Africa
 Foreign relations of Ukraine

References

External links 
  South African Department of Foreign Affairs about relations with Ukraine
   Ukrainian embassy in Pretoria

 
Ukraine
Bilateral relations of Ukraine